Pieter Egge Huistra (born 18 January 1967) is a Dutch football coach for Liga 1 club Borneo Samarinda and former winger. Huistra played for the Scottish Premier Division club Rangers from 1990 to 1995. He left there to play for Sanfrecce Hiroshima in the J. League. In 2001, he began coaching as the head coach for Jong Groningen. He was with them for four years before being named assistant coach of Aad de Mos at Vitesse. He then became an assistant coach with AFC Ajax and was named as their head coach on 24 April 2009. He was then the head coach of FC Groningen for the 2010–11 season. On 30 May 2012 he then became the head coach of the Eerste Divisie club De Graafschap. Finally, on 3 December 2014 he was appointed as the Technical Director of the Indonesia national football team.

Playing career
Huistra started his football career as an amateur with SC Joure and Drachtster Boys, where his qualities quickly stood out. He made his debut in professional football for FC Groningen at the age of 17 on 5 September 1984, when he replaced Anne Mulder after sixty minutes in a 1–3 defeat against FC Volendam.
After two seasons, he was loaned out to BV Veendam, who then entered the Dutch Premier League. He was then brought to FC Twente by coach Kees Rijvers. The left winger became a permanent fixture in the team and reached the Dutch national team. However, injury cost him his place in the squad for the 1990 World Cup. He played a total of eight international matches.

Rangers

Between 1990 and 1995 Huistra played for Scottish Premier Division club Rangers, becoming the first of a number of Dutch players to play for the club, where he won five League medals, three League Cup medals and two Scottish Cup medals. His farewell match for Rangers came on 14 January 1995 against Falkirk at Brockville Park, he scored 2 goals in a 3–2 victory. He left Rangers to play for Sanfrecce Hiroshima in the J1 League.

Coaching career
Huistra began his coaching career in 2000 as assistant coach of the Dutch nat.team-17. In 2001 he moved to Hong Kong to become assistant coach for the Hong Kong team for one year. After that he went back to FC Groningen to work in the youth academy and lead the -19 team. Jong Groningen He was there for four years. On 1 July 2005 he left Groningen and was named as the new assistant coach at Vitesse Arnhem.
After Vitesse he became an assistant coach at AFC Ajax as replacement of the injured Rob Witschge and was named as the new Jong Ajax Head Coach on 24 April 2009, In January 2010, after FC Groningen coach Ron Jans announced his intention to leave the club at the end of the season, Huistra was announced as new team head coach for the 2010–11 season.

He served as head coach for two full seasons. The first season was very successful. With attacking and exciting football and with a record number of points the team reached the final of the play offs to qualify for Europa League football in which it lost on penalty kicks. In the second season the club renewed his contract but many of the top players were sold. The new team was not capable to repeat the successful 2010–2011 season. Due to illness and injuries the club missed out on the play offs and ended in 14th place. the seasonal outcome, below the boards aspirations, led to his dismissal on 10 May 2012.

On 30 May 2012 he was announced as new head coach of recently relegated 2012–13 Eerste Divisie club De Graafschap, with the goal to bring his new club back to the top flight. In his first season with a complete new team he won a stage title and was named manager of the month. In the play offs for promotion the team lost in the second round against Roda JC. The directors rewarded his work with a contract renewal. In the second season Huistra got into a conflict with a small part of the fans and was fired on 24 December 2013.

On 3 December 2014 he was appointed as the Technical Director of the Indonesian football association, PSSI.

On 7 May 2015 he was called to become the interim coach of the Indonesia National Team for the 2018 World Cup qualifiers and the Asian Cup qualifiers in 2019. Unfortunately, 1 month later FIFA banned Indonesia to take part because of political interference.

In January Huistra became head coach of Japanese club Iwaki FC. Under supervision of Dome corporation he became the technical leader of the new start up club. The first season the club won several regional and national trophies.

On 31 March 2017 he was appointed as technical advisor of Slovak champion AS Trenčín until end of season. He left the club after the season to join Pakhtakor Tashkent FK in Uzbekistan. Together with Shota Arveladze they led the club from eight to third place and qualified for the Asian Champions League. In the second season Pakhtakor ended in second place and reached the Cup final. In December 2018 the Uzbek club renewed the contracts of all the technical staff for one year.
In 2019 the club had a good start when it qualified for the group stage of the Asian Champions league after winning two qualifying rounds. Huistra left Pakhtakor on 10 January 2022.

Club statistics

National team statistics

Honours

Player
Glasgow Rangers
 Scottish Premier Division/Scottish Premier League: 1990–91, 1991–92, 1992–93, 1993–94, 1994–95
 Scottish Cup: 1991–92, 1992–93
 Scottish League Cup: 1990–91 1992–93, 1993–94
Lierse SK
 Belgian Super Cup: 1997
 Belgian Cup: 1999

Manager
Pakhtakor
 Uzbekistan Super League: 2021
 Uzbekistan Super Cup: 2021

References

External links

 

1967 births
Living people
Dutch footballers
Dutch football managers
Dutch expatriate footballers
Expatriate footballers in Scotland
Netherlands international footballers
SC Veendam players
FC Groningen players
FC Twente players
Rangers F.C. players
Sanfrecce Hiroshima players
J1 League players
Expatriate footballers in Japan
Dutch expatriate sportspeople in Japan
Lierse S.K. players
RBC Roosendaal players
Expatriate footballers in Belgium
Eredivisie players
Scottish Football League players
Belgian Pro League players
People from Wymbritseradiel
AFC Ajax non-playing staff
Jong Ajax managers
FC Groningen managers
Iwaki FC managers
Dutch expatriate sportspeople in Belgium
Dutch expatriate sportspeople in Scotland
Dutch expatriate football managers
Association football midfielders
Footballers from Friesland
Dutch expatriate sportspeople in Indonesia
Dutch expatriate sportspeople in Uzbekistan